Gabriele Marotta (born 31 July 1967) is an Italian racing driver currently competing in the TCR International Series. He previously competed in the Superstars Series, Formula Palmer Audi, in various GT3 series, in the BPR Global GT Series, in the European Touring Car Series, the French Prototypes Championship, and the Italian Touring Car Championship.

Racing career
Marotta began his career in 1986 in the British Formula Ford B Championship. In 1987 he switched to the French Formula Ford Championship. In 1988 he raced in the French Formula Renault Turbo B Championship. He switched to the Italian Touring Car Championship in 1991, he raced in the championship for several years, namely for Toyota Italia and the works Alfa Romeo team Nordauto Engineering, achieving several race wins and podiums. From 1996-2005 he raced in several championships, including BPR Global GT Series, European Touring Car Series and Formula Palmer Audi. In 1999 he won the Coppa Italia at the wheel of a Peugeot 405 Mi16. In 2000 he won the European Touring Car Series at the wheel of a Peugeot. In 2009 Marotta switched to the Superstars Series, he finished the season 28th in the championship standings. He switched to the Superstars GTSprint championship in 2010, winning the GT4 class with a Maserati fielded by AF Corse. In July 2015, it was announced that Marotta would make his TCR International Series debut with Target Competition driving a SEAT León Cup Racer.

Racing record

Complete TCR International Series results
(key) (Races in bold indicate pole position) (Races in italics indicate fastest lap)

References

External links
 

1967 births
Living people
Italian racing drivers
Superstars Series drivers
TCR International Series drivers
AF Corse drivers